Vilhelm Krag (24 December 1871 – 10 July 1933) was a Norwegian poet, author, journalist and cultural personality. Known for coining the term Sørlandet to describe a region of Norway, he was the son of Peter Rasmus Krag and  younger brother of the novelist Thomas Krag.

His first volume of poetry, which came out in 1891, included many of his best-known poems: "Fandango", "Der skreg en fugl" (A bird cried), "Liden Kirsten" (Little Kirsten), "Majnat" (May night), "Mens jeg venter" (While I'm waiting), "Moderen synger" (The mother sings) and "Og jeg vil ha mig en hjertenskjær" (And I will have me a sweetheart).

Edvard Grieg set Krag's lyrics to music in his Opus 60, published in 1894. In the early 20th century  works by Krag were recorded in America by Florence Bodinoff, George Hamlin, Nathalie Hansen, Eleonora Olson, Ernestine Schumann-Heink, Aalrud Tillisch, and Carsten Woll.

References

External links

 
Vilhelm Krag texts set to music at the LiederNet Archive
Vilhelm Krag recordings and translations
Vilhelm Krag at the Internet Archive
English translation of Fandango
Articles in Norwegian
Vilhelm Krag at the Great Norwegian encyclopedia
Vilhelm Krag at the Norwegian biographical encyclopedia
Poetry Collections
Digte (1891)
Sange fra Syden (1893)
Nye Digte (1897)
Vestlandsviser (1898)
Vilhelm Krag at the National Jukebox
Im Kahne (Mens jeg venter) and The mother sings (Moderen synger)
Og jeg vil ha mig en hjertenskjær
Vilhelm Krag at the Cylinder Preservation and Digitization Project
Majnat
Art song
Der skreg en fugl: video
Der skreg en fugl: sheet music

1871 births
1933 deaths
19th-century Norwegian poets
Norwegian male poets
20th-century Norwegian writers
19th-century Norwegian male writers
20th-century Norwegian male writers